Chalak Sar (also Romanized as Chālak Sar and Chāleksar) is a village in Gurab Zarmikh Rural District, Mirza Kuchek Janghli District, Sowme'eh Sara County, Gilan Province, Iran. At the 2006 census, its population was 680, in 169 families.

References 

Populated places in Sowme'eh Sara County